Shepherdsville is a home rule-class city on the Salt River in Bullitt County, Kentucky, in the United States. It is the seat of its county, located just south of Louisville. The population was 14,201 during the 2020 U.S. Census.

History
Native Americans have been shown to have lived in the area for at least 15,000 years.

The vicinity was originally known by European Americans as "Bullitt's Lick" for the salt licks discovered by surveyor Capt. Thomas Bullitt in 1773. The area was home to Kentucky's first commercial salt works. These were shuttered in the 1830s because of competition from Virginian works along the Kanawha River (now in West Virginia). Shepherdsville developed around the mill and store erected along the Salt River by Adam Shepherd, who had purchased  in the area. The city received its charter in 1793 and was designated as the county seat when Bullitt County was formed in 1796.

The first post office opened in 1806. In 1836, a mineral water spa called Paroquet Springs opened. The mineral water was believed to have medicinal properties, so sufferers from a variety of maladies visited Shepherdsville to drink and bathe in the water. In the mid-1850s, the Louisville and Nashville Railroad's mainline was constructed nearby.

During the Civil War, the railroad bridge over the Salt River at Shepherdsville was a potential target for sabotage and was guarded by Union troops. In 1879 shortly after the formal end of Reconstruction, the Paroquet Springs hotel burned to the ground. Water from the springs continued to be bottled and sold until 1915.

The Lynching of Marie Thompson of Shepherdsville was conducted in 1904, close to the jail near Lebanon Junction.

About 50 people were killed in the Shepherdsville train wreck in late December 1917, a two-train collision that was the deadliest train wreck in Kentucky history.

Throughout most of the 20th century, Shepherdsville's economy was based on agriculture. It was a trading center for the county, and important for law and justice related to the county seat. Construction of the Kentucky Turnpike (now Interstate 65) in the 1950s stimulated residential development in the suburbs, as people who worked in Louisville could commute more easily to work. Many moved to Shepherdsville and other outlying areas to have new houses.

Geography
Shepherdsville is located on the banks of the Salt River.

Climate
The climate in this area is characterized by hot, humid summers and generally mild to cool winters.  According to the Köppen Climate Classification system, Shepherdsville has a humid subtropical climate, abbreviated "Cfa" on climate maps.

Demographics

As of the census of 2000, there were 8,334 people, 3,177 households, and 2,363 families residing in the city. The racial makeup of the city was 97.24% White, 0.92% African American, 0.35% Native American, 0.37% Asian, 0.02% Pacific Islander, 0.12% from other races, and 0.97% from two or more races. Hispanic or Latino of any race were 0.74% of the population.

There were 3,177 households, out of which 41.6% had children under the age of 18 living with them, 52.0% were married couples living together, 17.3% had a female householder with no husband present, and 25.6% were non-families. 20.7% of all households were made up of individuals, and 7.1% had someone living alone who was 65 years of age or older. The average household size was 2.59 and the average family size was 2.96.

In the city, the population was spread out, with 28.9% under the age of 18, 12.2% from 18 to 24, 33.4% from 25 to 44, 17.4% from 45 to 64, and 8.1% who were 65 years of age or older. The median age was 29 years. For every 100 females, there were 94.9 males. For every 100 females age 18 and over, there were 90.8 males.

The median income for a household in the city was $36,103, and the median income for a family was $40,878. Males had a median income of $31,324 versus $22,871 for females. The per capita income for the city was $16,519. About 13.7% of families and 15.2% of the population were below the poverty line, including 25.2% of those under age 18 and 8.6% of those age 65 or over.

According to realtor website Zillow, the average price of a home as of May 31, 2022 in Shepherdsville is $219,327.

Education
Area students attend Bullitt County Public Schools. Different sections of the city are zoned to one of the county's three regular public high schools:
 Most of the city is served by Bullitt Central High School, located in Shepherdsville proper.
Bernheim Middle and Bullitt Lick Middle are the middle schools for this area.
Cedar Grove Elementary, Lebanon Junction Elementary, Nichols Elementary, Roby Elementary and Shepherdsville Elementary are the primary schools for this area.
 Some northern areas are zoned to North Bullitt High School, which has a Shepherdsville postal address but is located in the city of Hebron Estates.
Hebron Middle and Zoneton Middle are the middle schools for this area.
Brooks Elementary, Freedom Elementary,  Maryville Elementary and Overdale Elementary are the primary schools for this area.
 Far eastern portions of the city are zoned to Bullitt East High School in Mount Washington.
Eastside Middle and Mt. Washington Middle are the middle schools for this area.
Crossroads Elementary, Mt. Washington Elementary, Old Mill Elementary and Pleasant Grove Elementary are the primary schools for this area.

The city also houses Riverview High School, the county district's alternative high school for at-risk students.

Shepherdsville has a public library, a branch of the Bullitt County Public Library.

Notable people

 Rick Bolus, high school basketball scout and analyst
 Wayne Edwards, NASCAR driver
 Charles Kurtsinger, U.S. Racing Hall of Fame jockey
 Alexandria Mills, Miss World 2010
 GTR Patricks Vindicator, Miniature Horse Ambassador, Animal Celebrity

See also

References

External links

 City of Shepherdsville official website
 "Shepherdsville: Salt of the Earth Provided Roots for First Settler; Town Has Withstood the Tests of Fire and Water", an article on the town from The Courier-Journal

Cities in Bullitt County, Kentucky
Cities in Kentucky
County seats in Kentucky
Louisville metropolitan area
1793 establishments in Kentucky
Populated places established in 1793